The long-beaked blind snake (Anilios grypus) is a species of snake in the family Typhlopidae, first described in 1918 by Edgar Waite as Typhlops grypus, and endemic to northern Australia (in Western Australia, the Northern Territory, and Queensland).

References

External links
Anilios grypus images and occurrence data from GBIF

Anilios
Reptiles described in 1918
Snakes of Australia
Taxa named by Edgar Ravenswood Waite